Club Deportivo Maipú, mostly known as Deportivo Maipú is an Argentine football club based in the city of Maipú, Mendoza. The team currently plays in Primera Nacional, the league of second level on the Argentine football league system.

Titles
Liga Mendocina (Primera División): 4
 1953, 1958, 1985–86, 2003
Liga Mendocina (Segunda División): 4
 1933, 1982, 1993–94, 1998

External links
 
 Locos por El Depo 
 Maipú de Mendoza 

Maipu
Association football clubs established in 1927
1927 establishments in Argentina